Lambula castanea is a moth of the family Erebidae. It was described by Walter Rothschild in 1912. It has only been recorded from Papua. The habitat consists of mountainous areas.

References

Lithosiina
Moths described in 1912